The Spinto Band is an American indie rock band from Wilmington, Delaware. Formed in 1996, the band comprises singer and guitarist Nick Krill, singer and bassist Thomas Hughes, drummer Jeffrey Hobson, keyboardist Sam Hughes, and guitarist Joey Hobson. They originally released music on their own label, Spintonic Recordings.

Biography
The Spinto Band was originally formed as recording project by college students in Wilmington, Delaware in 1996. Frontman Nick Krill describes being inspired to form the band after stumbling upon unused song lyrics penned by his grandfather, Roy Spinto, on the back of Cracker Jack boxes. Describing the early years of the band: "Every other band we knew back then would play in their garage and do the live thing. They’d do a bunch of concerts, then go, ‘Oh man, we’ve gotta record now?’ But we just had this crap in the basement and all we’d do was record, so we had 20 90-minute tapes full of junk before we played our first show."

After several releases on the band's own Spintonic label, the band released its proper debut album, Nice and Nicely Done, on Bar/None Records in 2005. The song "Oh, Mandy" was released as a single, and the group performed the first installment of filmmaker Vincent Moon's popular Take-Away Shows. The song was also featured as the soundtrack to a TV commercial for Sears, the payment for which funded the band's first European tour.

In 2008, the band signed to Park the Van Records and released its second full-length album Moonwink. The group promoted the album with a series of humorous videos on YouTube. Preorders of the album were accompanied with a 7-inch single that coupled the band original "Franco Prussian" with a cover of The Motors 1978 UK hit "Airport."

The following year, the band released an EP titled Slim and Slender. The four-song release contained three original songs and a cover of Ary Barroso's 1939 South American hit "Brazil."

The band released their third album, Shy Pursuit, on May 1, 2012.

Their studio album "Cool Cocoon" was released February 5, 2013 in the United States. The opening track "Shake It Off" was released on SoundCloud in November.

A reissue of their album "Nice and Nicely Done" was released in June 2017. The release includes 13 additional rarities and bonus tracks from the recording sessions of the album.

Band members
Nick Krill (guitar/vocals)
Thomas Hughes (bass guitar/vocals)
Jeffrey Hobson (drums)
Sam Hughes (keyboards)
Joey Hobson (guitar/backing vocals)

Member projects
Nick Krill toured with the band Clap Your Hands Say Yeah, playing guitar and keyboard. He is now a fulltime Mixer, Recording Engineer and Producer He has worked with The War on Drugs, Generationals, Clap Your Hands Say Yeah, The Dove and the Wolf, and Roar
Thomas Hughes has a band and video shorts project called Carol Cleveland Sings
Albert Birney plays in the Airkick Pigeon Band, as well as Teen Men, a new project with Nick Krill, Joey Hobson, and Catharine Maloney. Albert is also a filmmaker, in 2021 his film Strawberry Mansion premiered at the Sundance Film Festival. 
Jon Eaton, guitarist, until March 2011. In the words of Nick Krill, he "decided he didn't want to be a musician for the rest of his life and figured now is a good time to bow out."

Discography

Albums
Free Beer (1998), Spintonic Recordings - (as Free Beer)
30 Songs To Ease the Soul (1998), Spintonic Recordings - (as Free Beer)
Our Mama, Jeffrey (1998), Spintonic Recordings - (as Free Beer)
The Analog Chronicles (1998), Spintonic Recordings - (as Free Beer)
Digital Summer (New Wave Techno Pop) (1999), Spintonic Recordings
Roosevelt (2000), Spintonic Recordings
Mersey & Reno (2001), Spintonic Recordings
Nice and Nicely Done (2005), Bar/None Records
Moonwink (2008), Park the Van Records
Shy Pursuit (2012), Spintonic Recordings
Biba! 1 Island, 879 Votes (Original Soundtrack) (2013), Spintonic Recordings
Cool Cocoon (2013), Spintonic Recordings

Compilations
Sam Raimi (2000) - Spintonic Recordings
Strauss (2000) - Spintonic Recordings
Straub (2000) - Spintonic Recordings
Happy Naught Seven from The Spinto Band (2007)
You Be My Heart (2013)

EPs
The Spinto Band (EP) (2003) - Sleepglue Records
Good Answer (2004) - Spintonic Recordings
Slim and Slender (2009) - Park the Van Records

Singles

Notes

References

External links

The largest fan community on the web
A creative website driven by the Spinto Band and their friends
Article on The Spinto Band

Musicians from Wilmington, Delaware
Indie rock musical groups from Delaware
Bar/None Records artists